NSMB may refer to:

NSMB (mathematics), a Navier-Stokes finite volume solver
Nature Structural & Molecular Biology, an academic journal
 New Super Mario Bros. (series), a series of 2D platform games by Nintendo consisting of new revivals of classic Mario platformers
New Super Mario Bros., the first game in the series, released in 2006 for the Nintendo DS
, Server Message Block implementation on FreeBSD and other BSD systems including macOS